The modern constellation Ophiuchus lies across two of the quadrants symbolized by the Azure Dragon of the East (東方青龍, Dōng Fāng Qīng Lóng) and The Black Tortoise of the North (北方玄武, Běi Fāng Xuán Wǔ), and Three Enclosures (三垣, Sān Yuán), that divide the sky in traditional Chinese uranography.

The name of the western constellation in modern Chinese is 蛇夫座 (shé fū zuò), which means "the snake man  constellation".

Stars
The map of Chinese constellation in constellation Ophiuchus area consists of :

See also
Traditional Chinese star names
Chinese constellations

References

External links
Ophiuchus – Chinese associations
 香港太空館研究資源
 中國星區、星官及星名英譯表
 天象文學
 台灣自然科學博物館天文教育資訊網
 中國古天文
 中國古代的星象系統

Astronomy in China
Ophiuchus (constellation)